The Department of Fisheries is a department in the Government of New Brunswick, Canada. It is responsible for management of the Province's fisheries.

From 1882, fisheries was the responsibility of the Department of Agriculture until 1963 when the government of Premier Louis Robichaud created a separate Department of Fisheries and appointed Ernest Richard its minister. The department would be renamed the Department of Fisheries & Aquaculture which in 2000 was merged with the Department of Agriculture and Rural Development to become the Department of Agriculture, Fisheries and Aquaculture. This department lasted until October 3, 2006 when Premier Shawn Graham split the departments into the Department of Agriculture and Aquaculture and reestablished the separate Department of Fisheries.

Ministers 

Fisheries
New Brunswick
Ministries established in 1963
New Brunswick
Environmental agencies in Canada
Environmental organizations based in New Brunswick